Althoff is a surname. Notable people with the surname include:

 Althoff (Circus), one of the oldest and greatest Circusfamilies in the world, existing since 1660
 Ernie Althoff, an Australian musician
 Friedrich Althoff (1839–1908), Prussian Minister of Culture
 Adolf & Maria Althoff, Owner of a German Althoff-Circus, Righteous Among the Nations
 Kai Althoff (born 1966), German painter
 Pamela Althoff (born 1953), a Republican Illinois State Senator
 William Althoff, principal of St. Vincent's High School in 1883

See also
 Althoff Studios, an erstwhile (1939–1946) Film Studio in Berlin Babelsberg (Germany), later property of DEFA
 Althoff Catholic high school, high school in Belleville, Illinois